Athanasios "Thanasis" Papakonstantinou (born 26 April 1959) is a Greek singer-songwriter.

Short biography
He is married, with two children. Papakonstantinou studied mechanical engineering in Thessaloniki, which he practices as well as being a musician. After military service (all males are conscripted in Greece), he had a spell of handcrafting traditional Greek musical instruments.

Now a Larissa resident, Papakonstantinou has established himself as one of the most original and prolific people in the Greek music scene. He writes music in the Greek folk idiom, stemming from his own recollections of traditional songs his parents sang while working in the field. He usually writes his own lyrics or uses poems. He has collaborated with numerous notable artists from the Greek music scene, such as Giannis Aggelakas, Melina Kana, Sokratis Malamas, Lizeta Kalimeri, Nikos Papazoglou.

In 2002, his song Nanourisma was featured in the film by Nikos Grammatikos O Vasilias (The King). The 2007 documentary The Horns of the Bull is dedicated to Papakonstantinou's work.

Discography
 Αγία Νοσταλγία (Holy Nostalgia, Agia Nostalgia) (1993)
 Στην Ανδρομέδα και στη Γη (In Andromeda and on Earth, Stin Andromeda kai sti Gi) (1995)
 Της Αγάπης Γερακάρης (Falconer of Love, Tis Agapis Gerakaris) (1996)
 Λάφυρα (Loot, Lafyra) (1998)
 Βραχνός Προφήτης (Hoarse Prophet, Vrachnos Profitis) (2000)
 Αγρύπνια (Vigil, Agrypnia) (2002)
 Τα ζωντανά (The Live Ones, Ta Zontana) (2004)
 Οι πρώτες ηχογραφήσεις (The First Recordings, Oi protes ichografiseis) (2005)
 Η βροχή από κάτω (The Rain from Below, I vrochi apo kato) (2006)
 Διάφανος (Diaphanous, Diaphanos) (2006)
 Ο Σαμάνος (The Shaman, O Samanos) (2008)
 Ο ελάχιστος εαυτός (The Minimal Self, O elachistos eaftos) (2011)
 Πρόσκληση σε δείπνο κυανίου (Invitation to Cyanide Dinner,  Prosklisi se Deipno Kianiou) (2014)
 Με στόμα που γελά (A Mouth with a Smile,  Me stoma pou gela) (2018)
Απροστάτευτος (Unprotected, Aprostateftos) (2021)

Sample of lyrics
Rhyme from Agripnia, 2002: "Sleeplessness, ungroped animal!"; "Without a spit of affection /
In those who thirst for chimeras, you tilt / Your mug that's always empty."

Band members
 Babis Papadopoulos
 George Bandoek Apostolakis
 Alex Apostolakis
 Andreas Polyzogopoulos
 Costas Pantelis
 Florian Mikuta
 Tasos Misyrlis
 Makis Boukalis
 Sotiris Douvas
 Dimitris Mystakidis
 Dimitris Baslam
 Fotis Siotas
 Pantelis Stoikos
 Giannis Ioannidis
 Antonis Maratos
 Costis Zouliatis
 Costis Christodoulou
 Alexandros Ktistakis
 Martha Frintzila
 Matoula Zamani

References

External links
 Unofficial website devoted to Thanasis Papakonstantinou, in Greek (The artist and some of his musicians are active members of the forum)
 Fan page at Myspace

1959 births
Living people
20th-century Greek male singers
Greek songwriters
Greek entehno singers
Greek laïko singers
Greek laouto players
People from Larissa (regional unit)
21st-century Greek male singers